Michael Bevin (born 25 May 1977 in Hastings, New Zealand) is a field hockey goalkeeper from New Zealand. He won a silver medal at the 2002 Commonwealth Games in the men's team competition.

References

New Zealand male field hockey players
Male field hockey goalkeepers
1977 births
Living people
Commonwealth Games silver medallists for New Zealand
Field hockey players at the 1998 Commonwealth Games
1998 Men's Hockey World Cup players
Field hockey players at the 2002 Commonwealth Games
2002 Men's Hockey World Cup players
Commonwealth Games medallists in field hockey
Medallists at the 2002 Commonwealth Games